T. Ramachandran is an Indian politician and  Member of the 16th Tamil Nadu Assembly from the Thalli constituency.

Political career
Ramachandran began getting involved in politics. He joined the Communist Party of India (Marxist). He criticised the state leadership of CPI(M) in public, resigned and contested as independent candidate in 2006 Tamil Nadu Legislative Assembly election. Later, he joined the Communist Party of India in 2007.
He represented the Communist Party of India party in the Fourteenth Assembly (2011-2016). In the prior Assembly of 2006-2011 he represented the same constituency as an independent member.

Elections contested

Legal allegations

On October 5, 2012 Ramachandran faced allegations of instigating violence in connection with a temple festival in Nilgiris village near Uthanapalli near Hosur. 
Ramachandran was also arrested in the illegal quarry mining case registered in Kelamangalam Police station under Crime No. 201/2012 under sections 379 of IPC and 21 (IV) of Mines and Minerals Act and Section 4 of PPDL.
Ramachandran was arrested in connection with all the ten cases registered against him after the murder of PDK functionary T. Palani in Balepuram village on July 5, 2012.

In 2015 Ramachandran was charged under the Goondas Act for his alleged involvement in several murders and other anti-social activities.

References

Tamil Nadu MLAs 2006–2011
Tamil Nadu MLAs 2011–2016
Tamil Nadu MLAs 2021–2026
Living people
Communist Party of India politicians from Tamil Nadu
Vokkaliga politicians
1968 births